Michael Hunter (born 24 April 1945) is a former Scotland international rugby union player.

Rugby Union career

Amateur career

He played for Glasgow HSFP.

Provincial career

He played for Glasgow District. He was part of the Glasgow side that shared the 1974–75 Scottish Inter-District Championship with North and Midlands.

He played for Scotland Possibles on the trial match against the Scotland Probables side on 11 January 1975. He replaced Jordanhill's Andy Dougall in the centre. It was a strange trial; instead of playing 2 halves of 40 minutes, they played 3 thirds of 30 minutes each. In the first third, Hunter scored a try; and at the end of that third the Possibles were leading 6-0. The Probables came back into the match, but the Possibles ultimately took a rare victory, by 19 points to 16 points, in the fixture.

International career

He was capped by Scotland 'B' twice, between 1971 and 1972, both times against France 'B'.

He received a full senior cap for Scotland in 1974, against France in the Five Nations Championship. It was his only cap.

He went on the Penguins tour of Bermuda in 1974.

References

1945 births
Living people
Scottish rugby union players
Scotland international rugby union players
Rugby union players from Glasgow
Glasgow HSFP players
Scotland 'B' international rugby union players
Glasgow District (rugby union) players
Penguins International players
Scotland Possibles players
Rugby union centres